Antonios Miaoulis (1800 – October 25, 1836) was a Greek politician and a revolutionary leader during the Greek War of Independence.

Biography

He was born on the island of Hydra and was the second son of the Hydriot admiral Andreas Miaoulis, a member of the historic Miaoulis family.

He participated in many naval battles during the war, and when Otto of Bavaria became king, Antonios Miaoulis was appointed as his aide-de-camp. In this capacity he escorted Otto to Bavaria in 1836, where he was to be married to Amalia of Oldenburg. He died there on 25 October of cholera.

His sons were Andreas and Emmanouil.

1800 births
1836 deaths
People from Hydra (island)
Antonios
Greek people of the Greek War of Independence
Deaths from cholera